George Frederick Rogers (March 19, 1887 – November 20, 1948) was an American businessman and politician from New York, serving one term in the U.S. House of Representatives from 1945 to 1947.

Life
Rogers was born on March 19, 1887, in Harwood, Ontario.  He immigrated to the United States in 1899. He was educated in Canada and in Rochester, New York. Rogers became a merchant in Rochester.  He served for three years as president of the Monroe County Retail Food Merchants' Association

Political career 
He was a member of the Board of Supervisors of Monroe County from 1934 to 1935. He was a member of the New York State Senate (46th D.) in 1937 and 1938.

Congress 
He was elected as a Democrat to the 79th United States Congress, holding office from January 3, 1945, to January 3, 1947. He unsuccessfully ran for re-election in 1946 against Kenneth B. Keating and was defeated again by Keating in 1948.

Death and burial 
Rogers died on November 20, 1948, in Cobourg, Ontario.  He was buried at Riverside Cemetery in Rochester.

Sources

External links

1887 births
1948 deaths
Democratic Party New York (state) state senators
People from Northumberland County, Ontario
Politicians from Rochester, New York
Democratic Party members of the United States House of Representatives from New York (state)
20th-century American politicians
Canadian emigrants to the United States